Antwoine Sanders (born September 22, 1977) is a former American football safety. He was drafted by the Baltimore Ravens in the seventh round of the 2003 NFL Draft. He attended Terry Sanford High School in Fayetteville, North Carolina. He first enrolled at Independence Community College before transferring to Arizona Western College and later the University of Utah. Sanders was also a member of the Miami Dolphins.

He played for the Hamilton Tiger-Cats during the 2005 CFL season.

References

External links
Utah bio
Just Sports Stats
Scout.com
NFL Combine results
Antwoine Sanders news
Sports Illustrated

Living people
1977 births
Players of American football from North Carolina
American football safeties
Canadian football defensive backs
African-American players of American football
African-American players of Canadian football
Utah Utes football players
Baltimore Ravens players
Miami Dolphins players
Hamilton Tiger-Cats players
Sportspeople from Fayetteville, North Carolina
Independence Pirates football players
21st-century African-American sportspeople
20th-century African-American sportspeople